Thymarakia is a neighborhood of Athens. It takes its name from the Greek word 'θυμάρι' which means 'thyme', which was formerly plentiful in the area.

The area is served by Agios Nikolaos metro station on line 1 of the Athens Metro.

References

Neighbourhoods in Athens